Construction in Process was a series of international global exhibitions organized by artists in the 1980s and 1990s. The originator of this project was Polish artist Ryszard Wasko. Artists who were invited to participate in "Construction in Process" invite in turn, another group of participants, giving the project a dynamic, open character. Another original idea was to spur the artists to create their works on site.

Construction in Process I

The first CiP was titled, "The Community That Came?" (1981), curated by Anna Saciuk-Gąsowksa and Aleksandra Jach and took place in Łódź, Poland. It was symbolic as the birth of the Polish Solidarity movement.

Participants

 Carl Andre
 Patrick Ireland
 Richard Nonas
 Hartmut Boehm
 Servie Janssen
 Roman Opałka
 Michael Craig-Martin
 Kazuo Katase
 Dennis Oppenheim
 Ad Dekkers
 Stanislav Kolibal
 David Rabinowitch
 Ger Dekkers
 Tomasz Konart
 Jozef Robakowski
 Jan Dibbets
 Attila Kovacs
 Ed Ruscha
 Norman Dilworth
 Pawel Kwiek
 Reiner Ruthenbeck
 Peter Downsborough
 Les Levine
 Fred Sandback
 David Dye
 Sol LeWitt
 Richard Serra
 Ivan Galeta
 Richard Long
 Paul Sharits
 Tibor Gayor
 Peter Lowe
 Yoshio Shirakawa
 Gerhard V. Graevenitz
 Kenneth Martin
 Robert Smithson
 Dan Graham

 Dóra Maurer
 Peter Struycken
 Noriyuki Haraguchi
 Rune Mields
 Gunter Uecker
 Tim Head
 Antoni Mikolajczyk
 Ken Unsworth
 Anthony Hill
 Manfred Mohr
 Bernar Venet
 Nancy Holt
 François Morellet
 Ryszard Wasko
 Taka Iimura
 Maurizio Nannucci
 Ryszard Winiarski

Process und Konstruktion - Construction in Process II

The second edition took place in Munich, Germany in 1985, organized by Ryszard Wasko. It was created in response to the Berlin Wall, to form a cultural bridge between east and west.

Participants

 Norman Dilworth
 Sjoerd Buisman
 François Morellet
 Peter Downsborough
 Rebecca Horn
 Didier Vermeiren
 Kazuo Katase
 Yutaka Matsuzawa
 Ben Vautier
 Tomasz Konart
 Janusz Baldyga
 Erika Kiffl
 Les Levine
 Vito Acconci
 Roger Welch
 Sol LeWitt
 Charles Gaines
 Pat Steir
 Rune Mields
 Gunter Demnig
 Michael Witlatschil
 Antoni Mikolajczyk
 Halina Jaworski
 Ansgar Nierhoff
 Maurizio Nannucci
 Joseph Kosuth
 Massimo Nannucci
 Richard Nonas
 Tom Bills
 Hanne Tierney
 Roman Opalka
 Robert Ryman
 Joel Shapiro
 Fred Sandback
 Daniel Buren
 Paul Gees
 Richard Serra
 Steven Keister
 Ryszard Wasko
 Ugo Dossi
 Daniel Spoerri
 Lawrence Weiner
 Albert Mertz
 Ryszard Winiarski
 Hartmut Bohm
 Ewerdt Hilgemann

International Artists' Museum
In 1989, the International Artists' Museum with an international artists' board and Emmett Williams as president has been established in Poland, and other countries around the world. The Łódź Biennale is an international art celebration that is managed and supervised by the International Artists' Museum, the event was founded in 2004 and based on ideas developed during Construction in Process events.

Back in Łódź - Construction in Process III

The third edition was organized in 1990 in Łódź.

Participants

 Marcela Anselmetti
 Rolf Julius
 Daniel Reynolds
 Ilan Averbuch
 Wolf Kahlen
 Rafael Rheinsberg
 Janusz Baldyga
 Elzbieta Kalinowska
 Jozef Robakowski
 Reiner Barzen
 Andromahi Kefalos
 Ingrid Roscheck
 Terry Berkowitz
 Edmund Kieselbach
 Nicolas Rowan
 Tom Bills
 Marek Kijewski
 Karin Sander
 Monika Brandmeier
 Adam Klimczak
 Anthony Sansotta
 Jean Pierre Brigaudiot
 Svetlana Kopystiansky
 Igor Kopystiansky
 Eva Maria Schon
 Wojciech Bruszewski
 Philip Smith
 Hartmut Boehm
 Anna Kutera
 Mikolaj Smoczynski
 Peter D'Adostino
 Romuald Kutera
 Eric Snell
 Jacqueline Dauriac
 Emma J. Lawton
 Michael Snow
 Barco Dimitrijevic
 Edward Łazikowski
 Pawel Sobczak
 Peter Downsborough
 Les Levine
 Marek Sobczyk
 Kristian Dubbick
 Sol LeWitt
 Ann Thulin
 Bernd Eickhorst
 Emilio Lopez-Menchero
 Hanne Tierney
 Wendy Elliott
 Milovan Markovic
 Sissel Tolaas
 Lilli Engel
 Jonas Mekas
 Francesc Torres
 Gene Flores
 Rune Mields
 Tout
 Michael Galasso
 Antoni Mikolajczyk
 Endre Tot
 Klaus Geldmacher
 Teresa Murak
 Dagmar Uhde
 Jochen Gerz
 Giovanni Nicolini
 Micha Ullman
 Leszek Golec
 John Nixon
 Ken Unsworth
 Jerzy Grzegorski
 Richard Nonas
 Ian Wallace
 Ryszard Grzyb
 Ann Noel
 Maria Wasko
 Marcia Hafif
 Dennis Oppenheim
 Ryszard Wasko
 Tadashi Hashimoto
 Erick Oppenheim
 Lawrence Weiner
 Wolfgang Hainke
 Paul Panhuysen
 Emmet Williams
 Marygold Hodkinson
 Luigi Pasotelli
 Xawery Wolski
 Alexander Honory
 Beverly Piersol
 Brigida Wrobel-Kulik
 Peter Hutchinson
 Anna Plotnicka
 Marthe Wery
 Taka Iimura
 David Rabinowitch
 Sofia Zezmer
 Jean Luc Jehan
 Margaret Raspe

My Home is Your Home - Construction in Process IV

In 1993, the fourth edition, "My Home is Your Home" took place at the International Artists' Museum in Łódź.

Participants

 Peter Akfen
 Driss Sans Arcidet
 Sam Auinger
 Ay-O
 Su Baker
 Iwan Bala
 Krzysztof Bednarski
 Emilie Benes-Brzezinski
 Barbara Benish
 Tom Bills
 Andrea Blum
 Hartmut Boehm
 Jean-Pierre Brigaudiot
 Jurgen Brockmann
 Brad Buckley
 Lillian Budd
 Mimmo Catania
 Xang-Jie Chang
 Igor Chatskin
 Henning Christiansen
 Krzysztof Cichosz
 Jean Clareboudt
 Wojciech Czajkowski
 Carsten Dane
 Marta Deskur
 Peter Downsborough
 Richard Dunn
 Daniel Dutrieux
 Elena Elagina
 Marianne Eigenheer
 Andrey Filippow
 Dieter Froese
 Bernhard Garbert
 Jarg Geismar
 Allen Ginsberg
 Janusz Glowacki
 Toni Grand
 Kenneth Goldsmith
 Wenda Gu
 Marcia Hafif
 Amy Hauft
 Robin Hill
 Jusuf Hadzifejzofic
 Helen Mayer and Newton Harrison
 Sibylle Hofter
 Tom Homburg
 Sharon Horvath
 Jean-Luc Jehan
 Marek Janiak
 Andrzej Janaszewski
 Zhu Jinshi
 Sven-Ake Johansson
 Joan Jonas
 Helen Jones
 Laszlo Kerekes
 Yuiji Kitagawa
 Nazzih Khire
 Kay Kruger-Moths
 Wlodzimierz Ksiazek
 Harald Kubiczak
 Ewa Kulasek
 Tilman Kuentzel
 Eve Andree Laramee
 Emma J. Lawton
 Cecile Le Talec
 Richard Lerman
 Philis Levin
 Sol LeWitt
 LODZ FABRYCZNA GROUP
 Marcia Lyons
 Russel Lynch
 Christian Marclay
 Igor Makarevich
 Jean-Charles Massera
 Vusisizwe Mchunu
 Christoph Meier
 Harry Miller
 Antoni Muntadas
 Rune Mields
 Robert C. Morgan
 Tracy Morris and Paul Brewer
 Markus Mussinghoff
 Benno Mutter
 David Nash
 Joshua Neustein
 Malgorzata Niedzielko
 Ann Noel
 Richard Nonas
 NOTORIOUS GROUP
 Mordechai Omer
 Dennis Oppenheim
 Erik Oppenheim
 Sean O'Reilly
 Yigal Ozeri
 Mark Palmer
 Paul Panhuysen
 Matthew Partridge
 Tadeusz Piechura
 Vera Pogodina
 Joanna Przybyla
 R.H. Quaytman
 Yufen Qin
 Josef Ramaseder
 Philip Rantzer
 Michal Rovner
 Laurenee Laure and Jean-Christophe Royoux
 Patricia Ruiz-Bayon
 Robert Rumas
 Carl Rudiger
 Karin Sander
 Anthony Sansotta
 Gunnar Schmidt
 Buky Schwartz
 Roland Schefferski
 Glen Seator
 Judith Shea
 Seiji Shimoda
 Yuan Shun
 Christopher Snee
 Ronny Someck
 Suzy Sureck
 Maciej Toporowicz
 Nicholas Tsoutas
 Stuart Sherman
 Dagmar Uhde
 Francesc Torres
 Micha Ullman
 Ken Unsworth
 Hendri van der Putten
 Peter Vermeulen
 Henk Visch
 Gregory Volk
 David Wakstein
 Ryszard Wasko
 Jenny Watson
 James Welling
 Lawrence Weiner
 Kees Wevers
 Allan Wexler
 Emmett Williams
 Ryszard Winiarski
 Michael Witlatschil
 Jack Whitten
 Lynne Yamamoto
 Adem Yilmaz
 Harumi Yonekawa
 Sofia Zezmer
 Jian-Jun Zhang
 Konstantin Zvezdochatov

Co-existence - Construction in Process V

The desert Negev in Israel was the venue of the fifth CiP in 1995. The name "Co-Existence" or "Dukium" was created to coincide with the Israeli–Palestinian peace process.

 Marina Abramović
 Yael Amzaleg
 Ilan Averbuch
 Josefina Aerza
 Sam Bachrach
 Amnon Barzel
 Sarah Bayliss
 Elena Beriollo
 Tom Bills
 Hannes Boringer
 Sarah Birghberg
 Marianne Brouwer
 Emilie Bennes-Brzezinski
 Rana Bishara
 Malgorzata Borek
 Miriam Tovia Boneh
 Hartmut Boehm
 Monika Brandmeier
 Brad Buckley
 Mimmo Catania
 Yaacov Chefitz
 Charile Citron
 Lech Czolnowski
 Hayek Dauod
 Michael Delmi
 Agnes Denes
 Owen Drolet
 Zbigniew Dudek
 Orna Elstein
 Betu Simon Fainaru
 Dave Fasvoldt
 Wojtek Filipczak
 David Fagel
 Craig Fischer
 Regina Frank
 Alexandra Funk
 Martina Galvin
 Tslbi Geva
 Gideon Gechtman
 Jarg Geismar
 David Ginton
 Zarmuch Gilad
 Isaac Golombeck
 Eles De Groot
 Wenda Gu
 Jerzy Grzegorski
 Janusz Glowacki
 Marcia Hafif
 Paula Halwani
 Pawel Hartman
 Frederika Holt
 Jusuf Hadzifejzovic
 Oliver Herring
 Jessica Higgins
 Henry Philip Israel
 Amad Kanaan
 Laszlo Kerekes
 Daniel Kish
 Adam Klimczak
 Erika Knerr
 Alison Knowles
 Hana Kofler
 Anette Kovacs
 Loraine Kordecki
 Wlodzimierz Ksiazek
 Piotr Kurka
 Eve Andree Laramee
 Emme Lawton
 Sol LeWitt
 Arye Bar-Lev
 Russel Maltz
 Margalit Mannor
 Jenny Marketou
 Tomasz Matuszak
 Agata Michowska
 Robert C. Morgan
 Solfrid Mortensen
 Grzegorz Musial
 Markus Mussingfoll
 Beno Mutter
 Dominique Nahas
 Joshua Neustein
 Ann Noel
 Gideon Ofraf
 John O'Mara
 Dennis Oppenheim
 Yigal Oyeri
 Tamar Raban
 Lee Ramon
 Eli Ran
 Philip Rantzer
 Talia Rapaport
 Revina Regev
 Osvaldo Romberg
 Ayala Rom
 Michel Rovner
 Raphael Rubinstein
 Jack Sal
 Eva-Maria Schoen
 Glen Seator
 Bucky Schwartz
 Joshua Selman
 Arik Shapira
 Tamar Sharon
 Christopher Snee
 Gita Snee
 Malgorzata Sidor
 Ronny Somek
 Mariusz Soltysik
 Angelika Stepken
 Haim Steinbach
 Levia Stern
 Suzy Sureck
 Richard R. Thomas
 Danny Tisdale
 Maciej Toporowicz
 Dean Jokanovic-Toumin
 Susan Reimer Torn
 Dagmar Uhde
 Micha Ullman
 Vulto
 Gregory Volk
 Sharif Waked
 David Wakstein
 Maria wasko
 Lucja wasko
 Ryszard Wasko
 Alan wexler
 Emmett Williams
 Richard Wilson
 Adam Yilmaz
 Sophia Zezmer
 Baruch Zilbershats

The Bridge - Construction in Process VI

In 1998, the sixth edition was organized in Melbourne, Australia.

Participants

Ay-O
Marcus Bergner
Wendy Berick
Lauren Berkowitz
Tom Bills
Hartmut Böhm
Montien Boonma
Małgorzata Borek
Joan Brassil
Tim Burns
Karen Casey with Tim Cole
Krzysztof Cichosz
Henning Christensen
Charlie Citron
David Cranswick
Maria Cruz
Nick Curmi
DAMP
Domenico de Clario
Agnes Denes
Cor Dera
Gu Dexin
Anita Dube
Avraham Eilat
Martina Galvin
Jårg Geismar
Guillermo Gonzalez
Ann Graham
Jerzy Grzegorski
Phillip Gudthaykudthay
Edgar Harris
Paweł Hartman
Romuald Hazoume
Binghui Huangfu
Andrzej Janczewski
Magdalena Jetelova
Wolf Kahlen
Oki Kano
Fassih Keiso
Dok Hi Kim
Adam Klimczak
Maureen Lander
Sol LeWitt
Mary Longman
Rita McBride
Alastair MacLennan
Anna MacLeod
Andrew Margululu
Dhuwarrwarr Marika
Tomasz Matuszak
Dominique Mazeaud
Peter Minygulu
Markus Mussinghof
Michael Nicholls
John Nixon
Ann Noël
Bjørn Nørgaard
Jittima Pholsawek
Grzegorz Pleszyński
Kerrie Poliness
Kim Power
Josef Ramaseder
Alwin Reamillo
Józef Robakowski
Cameron Robbins
Lisa Roet
Sabine Russ
Mmakgabo Mmapula Helen Sebidi
William Seeto
Josh Selman
Paco Simon
Tex Skuthorpe
Christopher Snee
Mariusz Sołtysik
Mark Stoner
Suzy Sureck
Jon Tarry
Neil Taylor
Martine Pascale Tayou
Ken Thaiday Snr
David Hugh Thomas
Dagmar Uhde
Micha Ullman
M. S. Umesh
Albertina Viegas
Laura Vinci
Milos Vojtechovsky
Gregory Volk
Peter Walsh
Maria Wasko
Ryszard Wasko
Wastijn & Deschuymer
David Waters
Naup Waup
Lee Wen
Emmett Williams
Ah Xian
Djalinda Yunupingu

This Earth is a Flower - Construction in Process VII

In 2000, the last Construction in Process was held at the Regional Museum, Bydgoszcz in Bydgoszcz, Poland.

Participants

 Maria Thereza Alves
 Katherine Armstrong
 John Axon
 Siarzuk Baberka
 Janusz Baldyga
 Barbara Benish
 Maricn Berdyszak
 Elena Berriolo
 Mauro Bianchi
 Tom Bills
 Vladimir Biritski
 Margret Blondal
 Hartmut Böhm
 Monika Brandmeier
 Slawomir Brzoska
 Steve Buchanan
 Chandrasekaran S.
 Yaacov Chefetz
 Amarit Chusuwan
 Andrzej Ciesielski
 Mark Daniel Cohen
 Sylvie Courvoisier
 Witosław Czerwonka
 Vlasta Delimar
 Gunter Demnig
 Agnes Denes
 Tomasz Domański
 Peter Downsbrough
 Jacquie Dunn
 Jimmie Durham
 Barbara Edelstein
 Avram Eilat
 Tory Fair
 Jens Fånge
 Emilio Fantin
 Fred Firth
 Vadim Fishkin
 Gideon Gechtman
 John Gian
 Aleksandra Gieraga
 Matthew Gold
 Michael Goldberg
 Eugenia Gortchakova
 Lorenna Grant
 Izabella Gustowska
 Anne Graham
 Tadashi Hashimoto
 Romuald Hazoume
 Ulrike Hein
 Joanna Hoffmann
 Elżbieta Jabłońska
 Randy Jewart
 Joan Jonas
 Liliana Kadichevski
 Ahmad Kanaan
 Oki Kano
 Fassih Keiso
 Sora Kim
 Grzegorz Klaman
 Piotr Kurka
 Konrad Kuzyszyn
 Aleh Ladislau
 Algis Lankelis
 Via Levandovsky
 Vitaly Levchenya
 Les Levine
 Alicja Lewicka
 Oleg Ladysow
 Ivan Macha
 Brian Maguire
 Vlado Martek
 Antoni Maznevski
 Josiah McElheny
 Shirley Meshulam
 Robert C. Morgan
 Ikue Mori
 Florian Mutschler
 Anna Myca
 Warren Niesluchowski
 Ann Noël
 Richard Nonas
 Jüri Ojaver
 Dennis Oppenheim
 Ben Patterson
 Dorota Podlaska
 Doron Polak
 Grzegorz Pleszyński
 Steven Rand
 Dodi Reifneberg
 Daniel Reynolds
 Józef Robakowski
 Paul Rodgers
 Jon Rose
 Andreas Roth
 Sabine Russ
 Zygmunt Rytka
 Jack Sal
 Karin Sander
 Annika Carmen Schmidt
 William Seeto
 Michal Sedaka
 Christopher Snee
 Paco Simon
 Anatol Stepanenko
 Jon Tarry
 Pascale M. Tayou
 Richard Thomas
 Maciek Toporowicz
 Yvonne Troxler
 Dagmar Uhde
 M.S. Umesh
 R.H. Quaytman
 Cedomir Vasic
 Albertina Viegas
 Richard Vine
 Gregory Volk
 Sharif Waked
 Regina Walter
 Ryszard Wasko
 Jürgen Weichardt
 Lilly Wei
 Kirsten Weiner
 Lawrence Weiner
 Emmett Williams
 Jeanne Wilkinson
 Mike Wodkowski
 Gary Woodley
 Lynn Yamamoto
 Wojciech Zamiara
 Jian-Jun Zhang

References

Further reading
 History of The Artists’ Museum, edited by Muzeum Artystów - International Artists' Museum, Łódź 1998
 Vine, Richard (March 2000) Art in America, Report from Poland: Woodstock on the Brda, pg 55
 Stepkan,Angelika.  Arts Magazine, Volume 65, 1991
 The Bridge, Construction in Process VI, Edited by Richard Thomas. Book review by Rebecca Nissen, 2000
 The Artists’ Museum & Construction in Process, Lodz: The Artists’ Museum, 1999. (book)
 Sowinska-Heim, Julia.The urban space in Łódź as an archive. Material traces of Construction in Process. (2015) book Sztuka i Dokumentacja
 Szupinska-Myers, Joanna. The Political and Social Roots of the Lodz Biennial, Cosmopolitan Review, Summer, 2010, Vol. 2 No. 2
 Unwin, Richard. Fokus Lodz Biennale 2010, Frieze, Nov. 1, 2010
 Historia Muzeum Artystów, wyd. przez Muzeum Artystów - Międzynarodowe Muzeum Artystów, Łódź 1998

External links 
 Construction in Process  history of the exhibition-series
 Ryszard Wasko
 Lodz Biennale 2004

Visual arts exhibitions
International artist groups and collectives
Artist-run centres